Lin Gaoyuan (simplified Chinese: 林高远; traditional Chinese: 林高遠; pinyin: Lín Gāoyuǎn; born 19 March 1995) is a Chinese table tennis player. He was the Asian Cup champion in 2017, and was a member of the Chinese teams that took the gold medals at the 2018 Team World Cup and 2018 World Team Championships.

Career

2021
In May, Lin played the China Olympic Scrimmages, but he lost to Fang Bo in the group stage of the first leg. Lin lost 4–1 to Fan Zhendong in the quarter-finals of the second leg of the Chinese Olympic Scrimmage.

Senior career highlights, as of December 2018.

Singles
World Championships: Last 16 (2017) QF(2019, 2021)
World Cup: QF (2017), Bronze medalist (2018)
ITTF World Tour Grand Finals: SF (2017); Runner-up (2018)
ITTF World Tour:
Winner: 2017 Austrian Open
Winner: 2019 Hungarian Open
Winner: 2019 Hong Kong Open
Asian Championships: QF (2017), Runner-up (2019)
Asian Cup: Winner (2017); Runner-up (2018)

Doubles
World Championships: SF(2019) SF(2021, 2021)
ITTF World Tour:
Winner: 2011 Japan Open, 2014 Kuwait Open, 2019 Hong Kong Open
Asian Championships: Winner (2017, 2019)

Mixed doubles
World Championships: SF (2021)

Team events
World Team Championships: Winner (2018)
Team World Cup: Winner (2018, 2019)

References

External links

Lin Gaoyuan at Table Tennis Media

Chinese male table tennis players
1995 births
Living people
Sportspeople from Shenzhen
Table tennis players from Guangdong
Asian Games medalists in table tennis
Table tennis players at the 2018 Asian Games
Asian Games gold medalists for China
Asian Games silver medalists for China
Medalists at the 2018 Asian Games
World Table Tennis Championships medalists